Gonypetyllis is a genus of mantises belonging to the family Gonypetidae.

Species:
Gonypetyllis liliputana 
Gonypetyllis micra 
Gonypetyllis semuncialis

References

Gonypetidae